The history of the Jews in Moldova reaches back several centuries. Bessarabian Jews have been living in the area for some time. Today, the Jewish community living in Moldova numbers less than 4,000 according to one estimate, while local estimates put the number at 15,000–20,000 Jews and their family members.

Bessarabian Jews

Early history

 1889: There were 180,918 Jews of a total population of 1,628,867 in Bessarabia.
 1897: The Jewish population had grown to 225,637 of a total of 1,936,392.
 1903: Chișinău (Kishinev) in Russian Bessarabia had a Jewish population of 50,000, or 46%, out of a total of approximately 110,000. While almost non-existent in the countryside, Jews had been present in all major towns since the end of the 18th century and the beginning of the 19th. Jewish life flourished with 16 Jewish schools and over 2,000 pupils in Chișinău alone.
 16 February 1903: The Kishinev pogrom occurs.
 1920: The Jewish population had grown to approximately 267,000.
 1930: Romanian census registers 270,000 Jews.

Kishinev pogrom

In 1903, a young Christian Russian boy, Mikhail Rybachenko, was found murdered in the town of Dubăsari (Dubossary), 37 km northeast of Chișinău. A Russian language antisemitic newspaper "Bessarabian" began to disseminate rumors about the murder being part of a Jewish ritual. This newspaper had been publishing rumors about the Jews that brought ruin to the local Jewish population. As for the murder, it reported that the victim visited the shop of a Jewish tobacconist before his disappearance. Other anti-Semitic newspapers called for a pogrom. Although the official investigation had determined the lack of any ritualism in the murder and eventually discovered that the boy had been killed by a relative (who was later found), the unrest caused by these and other rumors had resulted in a major pogrom during the Easter holidays. The pogrom lasted for three days, without the intervention of the police. Forty seven (some say 49) Jews were killed, 92 severely wounded, 500 slightly wounded and over 700 houses destroyed.

Many of the younger Jews, including Mendel Portugali, made an effort to defend the community. There was outcry from prominent Russian writers Leo Tolstoy and Maksim Gorky, as well as protests from Jews and non-Jews in Europe and the United States. Haim Nachman Bialik wrote about the pogrom in his poem, "The City of Slaughter", and Vladimir Korolenko in his book, House No. 13.

The Holocaust

Up to two-thirds of Bessarabian Jews fled before the retreat of the Soviet troops. 110,033 people from Bessarabia and Bukovina (the latter included at the time the counties of Cernăuţi, Storojineţ, Rădăuţi, Suceava, Câmpulung, and Dorohoi – approximately 100,000 Jews) – all except a small minority of the Jews that did not flee in 1941 – were deported to the Transnistria Governorate, a region which was under Romanian military control during 1941–44.

 1941: The Einsatzkommandos, German mobile killing units drawn from the Nazi-Schutzstaffel (SS) and commanded by Otto Ohlendorf entered Bessarabia. They were instrumental in the massacre of many Jews in Bessarabia, who did not flee in face of the German advancement.
 July 8, 1941: Ion Antonescu, Romania's ruler at the time, made a declaration in front of the Ministers' Council:

... With the risk of not being understood by some traditionalists which may be among you, I am in favour of the forced migration of the entire Jew element from Bessarabia and Bukovina, which must be thrown over the border. Also, I am in favor of the forced migration of the Ukrainian element, which does not belong here at this time. I don't care if we appear in history as barbarians. The Roman Empire has made a series of barbaric acts from a contemporary point of view and, still, was the greatest political settlement. There has never been a more suitable moment. If necessary, shoot with the machine gun.

The killing squads of Einsatzgruppe D, together with special non-military units attached to the German Wehrmacht and the Romanian army were involved in many massacres in Bessarabia (over 10,000 in a single month of war, in June–July 1941), while deporting other thousands to Transnistria. From 1941 to 1942, those Jews deported to territories to distant regions of USSR and war zones on orders of Marshal Antonescu reached 56,089. A huge number of this population perished during the occupation of those territories.

In Nazi ghettos organized in several towns, as well as in Nazi concentration camps (there was also a comparable number of Jews from Transnistria in those camps) many people died from starvation or bad sanitation, or were shot by special Nazi units right before the arrival of Soviet troops in 1944. The Romanian military administration of Transnistria kept very poor records of the people in the ghettos and camps. The only exact number found in Romanian sources is 59,392 died in the ghettos and camps from the moment those were open until mid-1943 This number includes all internees regardless of their origin, but does not include those that perished on the way to the camps, those that perished between mid-1943 and spring 1944, as well as those that perished in the immediate aftermath of the Romanian army's occupation of Transnistria (see for example the Odessa massacre).

The Moldavian Soviet Socialist Republic
After World War II, the number of Jews in Moldavian Soviet Socialist Republic increased significantly, peaking at 98,001 in 1970. During the 1970s Soviet Union aliyah and immigration to the West and especially in the late 1980s, many of them emigrated to Israel, United States, Canada and some to Australia and Western Europe. The last Soviet census of 1989 registered 65,672 Jews in the Soviet Republic.

Contemporary situation

As of 2014, there are an estimated 15,000 Jews in Moldova, including over 10,000 in Chișinău alone. At the same time, there are 75,492 Moldovan Jews living in Israel, and also small communities in other parts of the world, such as Russia, the US, the UK, Germany, Romania, Australia, etc.

However, antisemitism is still commonplace; several churches and political organisations still refer to antisemitic rhetoric. In addition, far-right and neo-Nazi groups are active in the country. Because religion was heavily restricted in Soviet times, it is likely that there are many more people of ethnic Jewish heritage in Moldova than those who practice the religion, but many simply may not know about it.

See also

 Israel–Moldova relations
 History of the Jews in Chișinău
 History of the Jews in Romania
 Jewish Roots in Ukraine and Moldova

References

Further reading

External links
 JewishMemory, a site about Jews in Moldova

Moldova
Moldova
Moldova
Moldova
Jews
Moldova